S. Donna Geernaert is the chancellor of Mount Saint Vincent University located in Halifax, Nova Scotia.

References

Year of birth missing (living people)
Living people
Canadian university and college chancellors
Mount Saint Vincent University
Canadian women academics
Women academic administrators
Canadian academic administrators